Muriabad (also Romanized as Mūrīābād) is a village in Sabzdasht Rural District, in the Central District of Bafq County, Yazd Province, Iran. At the 2006 census, its population was 68, in 24 families.

References 

Populated places in Bafq County